Tantalate is an tantalum-containing anion or a salt of such an anion. A commercially important example is heptafluorotantalate (TaF72−) and its potassium salt (K2TaF7).

Many oxides of tantalum are called tantalates.  They are viewed as derivatives of "tantalic acid", hypothetic compounds with the formulas Ta2O5·nH2O or HTaO3). Examples of such tantalates are lithium tantalate (LiTaO3), lutetium tantalate (LuTaO4), neodymium tantalate (NdTaO4) and lead scandium tantalate (PST or Pb(ScxTa1-x)O3. Polyoxometallates containing tantalum provide examples of discrete tantalum oxides that exist in solution.

References

 
Oxometallates